On March 17, 2023, during the first round of the 2023 NCAA Division I men's basketball tournament, the Purdue University (Purdue) Boilermakers played a college basketball game against the Fairleigh Dickinson University (Fairleigh Dickinson, also FDU) Knights at the Nationwide Arena in Columbus, Ohio. The Boilermakers, who were seeded first in the east regional bracket and fourth overall in the NCAA tournament, faced the Knights, who were seeded 16th in the east regional bracket.

The Knights defeated the Boilermakers 63–58, becoming the first No. 16 seed out of the First Four to defeat a No. 1 seed in the NCAA Division I men's basketball tournament, and the second 16-seed overall after UMBC's win over Virginia in 2018. It is also just the third time a 16-seed has beaten a 1-seed in college basketball overall, after No. 16 seeded Harvard defeated overall No. 1 Stanford in the women's tournament twenty-five years earlier. As a result, the Knights made it to the Round of 32 for the first time in school history and became the first Northeast Conference team to win in the Round of 64. With Purdue set as a -point favorite heading into the game, Fairleigh Dickinson's victory was the biggest upset in terms of point spread in NCAA tournament history. Purdue ended their season at 29–6, while Fairleigh Dickinson improved to 21–15.

Background 
At the start of this game, NCAA tournament No. 16 seeds were 1–150 all-time against No. 1 seeds since the tournament field expanded to 64 teams in 1985. Five years prior to this game, the UMBC Retrievers became the first No. 16 seed to defeat a No. 1 seed, 74–54, over the Virginia Cavaliers.

Fairleigh Dickinson 

Fairleigh Dickinson entered its 2022–23 season under first-year head coach Tobin Anderson. A preseason Northeast Conference (NEC) coaches' poll picked the Knights to finish tied for sixth in their league. In the years since the analytics website kenpom.com began tracking average heights of D-I men's rosters in the 2006–07 season, only one other roster had a shorter average height. The team completed the regular season with a 19–15 record and a second-place finish in the NEC.

As the No. 2 seed in the NEC Tournament, they defeated St. Francis Brooklyn and Saint Francis (PA) to advance to the championship game against Merrimack. Because Merrimack is in the last season of a four-year transition period from Division II to Division I, the Knights received the conference's automatic bid to the NCAA Tournament, despite losing the conference championship game to Merrimack 66–67.

In the First Four, Fairleigh Dickinson defeated Texas Southern 84–61 to advance to the first round. After the game, Anderson said to the team in the locker room, "The more I watch Purdue, the more I think we can beat them."

Purdue 

Purdue entered its 2022–23 season under 18th-year head coach Matt Painter. Purdue had entered the season unranked but proceeded to win the Big Ten Conference regular season championship outright by three games. Junior center Zach Edey was named the conference's Player of the Year, Sporting News Player of the Year, and a consensus first-team All-American.  In the Big Ten Tournament, they defeated Rutgers, Ohio State, and Penn State, winning the tournament and finishing with a regular season record of 29–5. Purdue entered the tournament seeded fourth overall. As a result, Purdue would face the winner of the First Four match between Fairleigh Dickinson and Texas Southern. Fairleigh Dickinson won the game, 84–61, and would move on to face Purdue. Purdue entered the game the heavy favorite to win, favored by 23.5 points.

Broadcast 
The game was televised nationally on TNT and announced by Andrew Catalon, Steve Lappas, and Jamie Erdahl. The game was played before the start of the Florida Atlantic–Memphis game, which took place in the same venue.

Game summary 

Fairleigh Dickinson started the game off with a 5–2 lead, after a Sean Moore three-pointer. Purdue would then go on a 5–0 run to take a 7–5 lead at the first media timeout. The two teams would continue to trade the lead, as the Knights would end up being within one score or having the lead for the first 15 minutes, and a Demetre Roberts three-pointer gave Fairleigh Dickinson a six-point lead, their largest of the half. However, an 11–0 Purdue run gave the Boilermakers a five-point lead with five minutes left in the half. Fairleigh Dickinson forced eight turnovers in the first half, including one off a full-court press near the end of the half leading to a Heru Bligen layup that gave the Knights a 32–29 lead, but Purdue’s Braden Smith hit two free throws at the end of the half to make it 32–31.

After halftime, Fairleigh Dickinson would outscore Purdue 7–5, before the first media timeout of the half, taking a three-point lead. The Knights would extend the lead to five, before an 11–0 Purdue run gave them their largest lead of the game. Fairleigh Dickinson, down by six points, went on their own 8–0 run to reclaim the lead, before a Zach Edey tip shot tied the game at 49–49. At the eight-minute mark, an Edey free throw would give Purdue a 50–49 lead, their last of the game. After a Fletcher Loyer three-pointer with 7:09 left, the game would remain deadlocked with FDU leading 54–53 until a pair of Moore free throws with 2:50 left. After a Purdue timeout, Edey mishandled the inbounds catch, leading to a Moore layup for a Fairleigh Dickinson five-point lead with 1:26 to play. The Boilermakers would respond with a Loyer three-pointer, only for Moore to hit his own three for a 61–56 Knights lead. On the next possession, Purdue would draw a foul, and Loyer made both free throws to make it a one score game. After a missed opportunity, Purdue had a chance to tie the game, but instead Smith opted to try for a layup that was blocked by Moore. However, Purdue would get another offensive opportunity to tie the game, but Loyer's three-point try was an airball and the Boilermakers were forced to foul with seven seconds left. After two made free throws by Roberts, Fairleigh Dickinson would take a five-point lead and would go on to win 63–58.

Moore, a Columbus native, scored a team-high 19 points in the Knights' upset, while Edey scored 21 points and grabbed 15 rebounds in a losing effort for the Boilermakers.

Box score 
Source:

Aftermath 

In its immediate aftermath, the game was considered possibly the biggest upset in tournament history, mainly owing to Fairleigh Dickinson's significant underdog status; besides being the largest upset of all time by point spread, Fairleigh Dickinson had entered the tournament as the 68th and last-ranked team overall, and they had received the Northeast Conference's automatic bid despite losing the conference championship game (champion Merrimack was ineligible due to their transition from Division II). FDU's 2022–23 strength of schedule ranked 363rd and last in Division I according to KenPom.com; also, as noted previously, FDU's roster per KenPom.com was the shortest overall in Division I.

Purdue became the first team in tournament history to lose in consecutive years to 15-seeds or worse, having previously been eliminated by 15-seed Saint Peter's in the Sweet 16 of the 2022 tournament; additionally, the Boilermakers had been eliminated in the first round of the 2021 tournament by 13-seed North Texas.

Fairleigh Dickinson advanced to the Round of 32, in which they faced the 9-seed Florida Atlantic Owls on March 19, 2023. The game was competitive throughout the majority of the game, and the Knights led throughout the first ten minutes of the second half. However, the Owls won the game 78–70, thus ending FDU's two-game Cinderella run.

Before the game, CBSSports.com reported there were 22 perfect brackets left in their March Madness tournament. After Purdue's loss however, it was reported that there were no longer any perfect brackets remaining, only two days after the tournament started.

See also 
 2019 Tampa Bay Lightning–Columbus Blue Jackets playoff series, a playoff series upset involving Nationwide Arena

References

External links 

2022–23 Northeast Conference men's basketball season
2022–23 Big Ten Conference men's basketball season
Fairleigh Dickinson Knights men's basketball
Purdue Boilermakers men's basketball
Basketball in Columbus, Ohio
NCAA Division I men's basketball tournament games
March 2023 sports events in the United States
2023 in sports in Ohio